The BBÖ 12 was a class of two 2-2-2T express train tank locomotives with the Federal Railway of Austria (Bundesbahnen Österreichs, BBÖ).

Convinced by the performance of the kkStB 112 series, the BBÖ decided in 1934 to procure tank engines for regional express services as well. For reasons of cost, however, they achieved this by converting kkStB 97 series 0-6-0 tank locomotives built in 1898 by Krauss/Linz). One unit was converted by the Lokomotivfabrik Floridsdorf in 1934 and another in 1937. Locomotives 97.153 and 97.152 were used for the conversion. The boiler and the valve gear were used unchanged. Oil-firing was provided, the tank for which was installed on the rear section of the boiler barrel, and enabled one-man operation. The engines were given a special livery with the water tanks and driver's cab being painted light green.

The little locomotives proved themselves well, but no more were converted, because from 1935 the BBÖ DT 1 was available for short express trains.

In 1938 the Deutsche Reichsbahn took the engines over as 69 001 and 69 002. Only the latter was still around after the Second World War. It became ÖBB 69.02 in the Austrian Federal Railways (ÖBB) and was used on a bridge inspection train. This engines is still preserved today.

See also 
 Deutsche Reichsbahn
 List of DRG locomotives and railbuses

References 
 
 
 

120
2-2-2T locomotives
Floridsdorf locomotives
Standard gauge locomotives of Austria
Railway locomotives introduced in 1934
Passenger locomotives